Enzo Nahuel Tejada (born 27 January 1997) is an Argentine professional footballer who plays as a midfielder for Huracán Las Heras.

Career
Tejada's career began with Huracán Las Heras, before a move to Gimnasia y Esgrima. He was promoted into the first-team by manager Sergio Arias in the 2015 Primera B Nacional campaign, appearing for his professional debut on 21 March during a 5–1 defeat to Guaraní Antonio Franco. Four further appearances followed as Gimnasia y Esgrima suffered relegation to Torneo Federal A. In the middle of the campaign, in June 2015, Tejada was loaned by Internacional of Brazil's Série A. On 5 August 2016, Tejada joined Primera División side Unión Santa Fe on loan. He didn't make an appearance for either of the two.

Tejada left Gimnasia y Esgrima in 2018. On 18 January 2019, Tejada signed with Fundación Amigos ahead of the inaugural Torneo Regional Federal Amateur. Seven months later, having scored his first three senior goals in the fourth tier, Tejada moved to Torneo Federal A to rejoin Huracán Las Heras.

Career statistics
.

References

External links

1997 births
Living people
Sportspeople from Mendoza Province
Argentine footballers
Association football midfielders
Argentine expatriate footballers
Expatriate footballers in Brazil
Argentine expatriate sportspeople in Brazil
Primera Nacional players
Torneo Federal A players
Gimnasia y Esgrima de Mendoza footballers
Sport Club Internacional players
Unión de Santa Fe footballers